The 2010 season for  began in January with the Tour de San Luis and ended in October at the Giro di Lombardia. As a UCI ProTour team, they were automatically invited and obliged to attend every event in the ProTour.

The team's ridership changed drastically between the 2009 and 2010 seasons, bringing in a sizeable number of new cyclists. Only 5 of its 25 riders were retained from 2009. Six of the departures joined other ProTour teams for 2010, while of the twenty one new cyclists the team acquired, none rode at that level in 2009.

2010 roster
Ages as of January 1, 2010.

Riders who joined the team for the 2010 season

Riders who left the team during or after the 2009 season

One-day races

Spring classics

Fall races

Stage races
Valls took the team's first stage win of the year, at the Tour de San Luis. Valls broke away from specialist climbers in the leading peloton to solo to the finish line. The victory also gave him the overall leadership in the race at the time. Valls also won the race's mountains classification. The team next took a stage win at the first ProTour event of the season, the Tour Down Under.

Grand Tours

Giro d'Italia
The team was one of 22 invited to the Giro d'Italia. They were not competitive at any point in the race. After failing to have any riders contesting the finishes to the Giro's first two road race stages, their best-placed rider in the overall standings before the transfer to Italy was Brändle in 51st, two minutes back of the race leader. The squad's time in the stage 4 team time trial was provisionally second-best for much of the day, but it ended up being good for only 14th place. In stage 9, Cheula made the morning breakaway, but the stage was decided by a mass sprint, in which Eibegger was 10th. In stage 13, Mayoz made a successful breakaway and came close to a stage win, finishing third in the sprint behind Manuel Belletti and Greg Henderson. This was as close as the team came to any victories. Their best rider in the final overall standings was Mayoz in 22nd place, over an hour back of Giro champion Ivan Basso. The squad also had the dubious distinction of fielding the last-place overall rider; this was Corti, at a deficit to Basso of nearly five hours. They were 18th in the Trofeo Fast Team standings and last in the Trofeo Super Team.

Tour de France
With the guaranteed invite awarded in September 2008 to the former Saunier Duval-Scott team (this same team with different sponsors), Footon was one of 22 teams in the Tour de France. They were, as they were most of the season, greatly overmatched by their competition – none of the nine riders on Footon's squad had previously ridden any Grand Tour.

Cardoso, who earlier in the season had taken the team's only ProTour-level win, crashed hard near the end of the  prologue time trial, and completed it six minutes slower than stage winner Fabian Cancellara. He did not start the first road race stage the next day. The team showed combativity in early stages. Mayoz made it to the morning breakaway with four others in stage 4, but their group was easily caught before a field sprint finish won by Alessandro Petacchi. In stage 7, Valls rode with the leading group on the road after making a selection in the leading peloton. He rode the late parts of the stage just behind the day's winner Sylvain Chavanel, taking second place 57 seconds behind him and 50 seconds ahead of the race's elite riders. Capecchi also rode solidly on this day, taking tenth on the stage from within the main peloton. Benitez found the breakaway in stage 11, but the group did not stay away. Pérez was in the breakaway in stage 15. While Thomas Voeckler was the winner that day, Pérez did hold on for third, as the race's elite riders did not try to catch all members of the day's escape. Valls was the team's highest-placed overall finisher, coming in 53rd at a deficit of one hour and 42 minutes to Tour champion Alberto Contador. The squad was 20th in the teams classification.

Vuelta a España

Season victories

References

2010 road cycling season by team